Hemiancistrus meizospilos is a species of catfish in the family Loricariidae.  It is sometimes known as the southern orange-spotted pleco. The type locality of H. meizospilos is given as the Chapecó River in the vicinity of Coronel Freitas in the Brazilian state of Santa Catarina.

Distribution 
Hemiancistrus meizospilos is native to South America, where it occurs in the Uruguay River basin in Brazil.

Description 
Hemiancistrus meizospilos was described in 2004 by Alexandre R. Cardoso and José Pezzi da Silva alongside the related species Hemiancistrus votouro, which is also native to the Uruguay River basin. The species reaches 14.9 cm (5.9 inches) SL making it one of the smaller members of Loricariidae. H. meizospilos is distinguished from other Hemiancistrus members by the Lighty colored spots found on all of the fins and the dorsal segment of the body.

References 

Ancistrini
Fish described in 2004